Amphidromus mouhoti is a species of medium-sized air-breathing tree snail, an arboreal gastropod mollusk in the family Camaenidae.

Habitat 
The species' habitat is mostly in trees.

Distribution 
The species can be found in parts around Đồng Nai Province, South Vietnam.

References 

mouhoti
Fauna of Vietnam
Gastropods described in 1861